Endrick dos Santos Parafita (born 7 March 1995), known as Endrick, is a Brazilian-born Malaysian professional footballer who plays as a midfielder for Malaysia Super League club Johor Darul Ta'zim.

Club career

Early career
Endrick began his career as a footballer with the Brazilian club Ypiranga in 2014.

Campinense Clube, Santa Rita
In 2015, he moved to another club in Brazil, Campinense. Later that same year, he moved to the Angolan club Santa Rita de Cássia.

Cyprus
In 2016 he began his career in Europe by joining the Cypriot First Division club Apollon Limassol. In 2017 he was loaned out to AEZ Zakakiou.

Romania
He later moved to the Romanian club Botoșani.

Malaysia
In 2018, he began his career in Asia with a move to the Malaysian football club Felcra, where he helped the club to become the runners-up in the Malaysia Premier League.

Selangor F.C.
In 2019, he moved to one of biggest clubs playing in the Malaysia Super League, Selangor.

Penang
In 2020, he moved to another club in the Malaysia Super League, Penang. He helped them to win the 2020 Malaysia Premier League, thus securing their promotion to the Malaysian Super League.

Johor Darul Ta'zim F.C.
On 5 January 2023, Endrick signed for Johor Darul Ta'zim as part of their campaign in the upcoming Malaysia Super League and AFC Champions League. As he had been playing in Malaysia for the last 5 years, he was signed and registered as a local player after acquiring Malaysian citizenship.

International career
As he was born in Brazil but later acquired Malaysian citizenship, Endrick is eligible to play for Brazil and Malaysia. On 15 March 2023, he received his first national call up to the Malaysian national team for the centralised training camp beginning on 18 March ahead of the international friendlies against Turkmenistan and Hong Kong.

Honours
Felcra
 Malaysia Premier League runner-up: 2018

Penang
 Malaysia Premier League: 2020

Johor Darul Ta'zim
 Malaysia Charity Shield: 2023

References

External links
 
 

1995 births
Living people
Brazilian footballers
Ypiranga Futebol Clube players
Campinense Clube players
Apollon Limassol FC players
AEZ Zakakiou players
FC Botoșani players
Cypriot First Division players
Liga I players
Brazilian expatriate footballers
Expatriate footballers in Cyprus
Brazilian expatriate sportspeople in Cyprus
Expatriate footballers in Romania
Brazilian expatriate sportspeople in Romania
Malaysian people of Brazilian descent
Association football midfielders